Per Øystein Grimstad (born 7 January 1934) is a Norwegian businessperson, diplomat and politician for the Labour Party.

He was born in Sandnessjøen, and is a siv.ing. by education. He was the CEO of Norconsult from 1980 to 1986, a State Secretary in the Ministry of Industry from 1986 to 1988, director of the Norwegian Agency for Development Cooperation from 1988 to 1996 and the Norwegian ambassador to South Africa from 1996 to 2000.

He used to be married to the singer Birgitte Grimstad.

References

1934 births
Living people
Norwegian businesspeople
Directors of government agencies of Norway
Ambassadors of Norway to South Africa
Labour Party (Norway) politicians
Norwegian state secretaries
People from Alstahaug